Icon is the third compilation album by American rap rock band Limp Bizkit. Released in 2011, it is a retrospective compiling material from the band's albums Three Dollar Bill, Yall$, Significant Other, Chocolate Starfish and the Hot Dog Flavored Water, Results May Vary and The Unquestionable Truth (Part 1).

Music and lyrics 

The music of Icon has predominantly been described as nu metal and is noted for "kinetic, frenzied energy". On this compilation, DJ Lethal functions as a sound designer for the band, shaping their sound. According to Lethal, "I try and bring new sounds, not just the regular chirping scratching sounds. [...] It's all different stuff that you haven't heard before. I'm trying to be like another guitar player."

Wes Borland's guitar playing on this compilation is experimental and nontraditional, and is noted for creative use of six and seven-string guitars. The songs from Three Dollar Bill, Yall$ feature him playing without a guitar pick, performing with two hands, one playing melodic notes, and the other playing chord progressions. His guitar playing on this album also makes use of octave shapes, and choppy, eighth-note rhythms, sometimes accompanied by muting his strings with his left hand, creating a percussive sound. Borland's guitar playing also has unevenly accented syncopated sixteenth notes to create a disorienting effect, and hypnotic, droning licks.

Durst's lyrics are often profane, scatological or angry. Much of Durst's lyrical inspiration came from growing up and his personal life. The breakup with his girlfriend inspired the Significant Other songs "Nookie" and "Re-Arranged".

Critical reception 

Allmusic's Stephen Thomas Erlewine wrote that Icon "[provides] a good overview of the leading rap-metal outfit of the '90s."

Track listing

Personnel 

 Fred Durst - vocals
 Wes Borland - guitars
 Mike Smith - guitar on track 9
 Randy Pereira - guitar on track 10
 Sam Rivers - bass
 John Otto - drums, percussion
 DJ Lethal - turntables, samples, keyboards, programming, sound development

References 

2011 greatest hits albums
Limp Bizkit compilation albums
Albums produced by Rick Rubin